The 20th Avenue station is a local station on the BMT West End Line of the New York City Subway, located at the intersection of 20th Avenue and 86th Street in Bensonhurst, Brooklyn. It is served by the D train at all times.

History 
20th Avenue opened on July 29, 1916, as part of an extension of the BMT West End Line from 18th Avenue to 25th Avenue. The line was originally a surface excursion railway to Coney Island, called the Brooklyn, Bath and Coney Island Railroad, which was established in 1862, but did not reach Coney Island until 1864. Under the Dual Contracts of 1913, an elevated line was built over New Utrecht Avenue, 86th Street and Stillwell Avenue, replacing the surface railway.

In 2012, the station was rehabilitated with funding from the American Recovery and Reinvestment Act of 2009.

Station layout

This elevated station has two side platforms and three tracks. The center express track is not normally used. The Coney Island-bound platform is slightly to the south of the Manhattan-bound platform, which accounts for the locations where the platforms were extended.

Both platforms have beige windscreens along their entire length and brown canopies with green frames and support columns in the center. The exposed section of the platforms have black, full-height lampposts at regular intervals. The station signs feature the standard black station name plate with white lettering.

The 2012 artwork here is called Kaleidoscope by Odili Donald Odita. It features abstract laminated glass windows on the platform windscreens based on Odita's visual memories of the Bensonhurst neighborhood.

Exits
This station has one elevated station house beneath the center of the platforms and tracks. Two staircases from each platform go down to a waiting area/crossunder, where a turnstile bank provides access to and from the station. Outside fare control, there is a token booth and four staircases going down to all corners of 20th Avenue and 86th Street.

References

External links 
 
 Station Reporter — D Train
 20th Avenue entrance from Google Maps Street View
 Platforms from Google Maps Street View
 20th Avenue at TheSubwayNut 

1916 establishments in New York City
Bensonhurst, Brooklyn
BMT West End Line stations
New York City Subway stations in Brooklyn
Railway stations in the United States opened in 1916